Jimmy the Lock is the debut solo studio album by American rapper Nocando. It was released by Alpha Pup Records on January 26, 2010. It includes productions from Nosaj Thing, Nobody, Thavius Beck, Free the Robots, and Daedelus. The remix version of "Hurry Up and Wait" was premiered by Los Angeles Times in May 2010.

Critical reception

Zoneil Maharaj of XLR8R gave the album an 8.5 out of 10, commenting that the album lives in both worlds of "the heralded cipher circle Project Blowed and beat-head bastion Low End Theory." Jeff Weiss of LA Weekly called it "one of the best and most forward-thinking L.A. hip-hop records in years." Andrew Noz of NPR wrote: "His lineage is of the legendary Project Blowed open mic, breeding ground for underground heroes such as Jurassic 5 and Freestyle Fellowship, and you can hear the double-time jazz-rap madness of the latter spilling over into his rigid cadences."

Track listing

Personnel
Credits adapted from liner notes.

 Nocando – vocals, executive production
 Busdriver – vocals (3)
 Open Mike Eagle – vocals (6)
 Verbs – vocals (7)
 The Gaslamp Killer – turntables (2)
 D-Styles – turntables (6)
 DJ Zo – turntables (12)
 Nosaj Thing – production (1)
 Nobody – production (2, 5)
 Thavius Beck – production (3, 7, 12)
 Nick Diamonds – production (4)
 Free the Robots – production (6)
 Maestroe – production (8, 9, 10)
 Daedelus – production (11)
 Daddy Kev – recording, mixing, mastering, executive production
 Reckluse – additional recording
 Bastard Artist – photography
 Sonny Kay – cover design

References

External links
 
 

2010 debut albums
Alpha Pup Records albums
Nocando albums
Albums produced by Thavius Beck